Hennadii Anatoliyovych Vatsak (born 9 February 1972) is a Ukrainian businessman and politician currently serving as a People's Deputy of Ukraine representing Ukraine's 16th electoral district as a member of For the Future. Secretary of the Verkhovna Rada Committee on Transport and Infrastructure.

Biography 
Hennadii Anatoliyovych Vatsak was born on 9 February 1972 in the city of Mohyliv-Podilskyi in Ukraine's Vinnytsia Oblast. He has a vocational education. After school he entered the Mohyliv-Podilsky Medical College, graduating in 1991. Until 1994 he worked as a paramedic at a children's hospital. From 1995 to 1999 he worked as a waiter in a restaurant.

He owns the Vatsak Confectionery House, which produces confectionery. He also announced in 2018 that he plans to start a construction business by building 4 plants in Mogilev-Podolsky.

Political activity 
In 2015 he was elected a deputy of the Vinnytsia Regional Council from the Petro Poroshenko Bloc. Secretary of the Standing Committee of the Regional Council on Legality, Anti-Corruption, Lustration, Rules of Procedure and Deputies' Activities. His assistant is Tetiana Anatoliyivna Fomenko. Vatsak is considered one of the richest deputies in Vinnytsia.

In 2019, he ran for the Verkhovna Rada of Ukraine in Ukraine's 16th electoral district (Mohyliv-Podilskyi, Kryzhopilskyi, Mohyliv-Podilskyi, Pishchanskyi, Chechelnytskyi, Yampilskyi districts) as an independent self-nominated candidate. At the time of the election, Vatsak was director of the Marketing Department of Vatsak Confectionery House LLC, an independent, and living in Mohyliv-Podilskyi.

On 17 December 2020, he voted "FOR" the appointment of the plagiarist SM Scarlett as Minister of Education and Science, who was even opposed by the relevant committee.

Automobiles 
In 2008 he owned a Hummer car, which he sold in 2013. Then he started driving a BMW X6 in 2009. Then he changed his car from a BMW X6 to a Maserati Quattroporte Q4 and a Jaguar F-Type.

Charity 
In 2016, he opened a children's chess school "Vatsak" in Mohyliv-Podilskyi. Supported by the sports club "Spartak-Vatsak", the club won the Vinnytsia Kickboxing Cup in 2016. He built a 40-meter fountain on Shana Square in Mogilev-Podolsky.

In 2013 he won the nomination "Philanthropist: small business (including individuals - entrepreneurs)" of the National Competition "Charitable Ukraine - 2013".

Criticism 
According to media reports, he bribed voters. In particular, on 11–13 June 2019, self-nominated Vatsak opened three photo zones "I love my city / village" in Gorodkivka, Pishchanka and Kryzhopil. The discoveries were accompanied by entertainment, competitions and treats with sweets  Vatsak also financed the organization of a mixed martial arts tournament (MMA) in Yampil, and distributed cash prizes to soldiers and residents of the city. In June 2019, self-nominated Vatsak launched the launched a social campaign "See Better" for residents of the 16th electoral district.

Hennadiy Vatsak bought 5 cars and did not make significant changes to his property status. This was reported by the Vinnytsia Community.

References 

1972 births
Living people
Ninth convocation members of the Verkhovna Rada
Independent politicians in Ukraine
People from Mohyliv-Podilskyi
Petro Poroshenko Bloc politicians